General elections were held in Lebanon between 27 August and 3 September 2000 to elect the 128 members of the Parliament of Lebanon. Independent candidates won the majority of seats, although most of them were considered members of various blocs. Voter turnout was 40.5%.

Results

Of the 86 independent MPs, 48 were considered to be members of various blocs:
26 in the Hariri bloc
6 in the Berri bloc (plus the ten Amal Movement MPs)
6 in the Jumblatt bloc (plus the six Progressive Socialist Party MPs)
5 in the Faranjiyyah bloc
3 in the Murr bloc
2 in the Hezbollah bloc (plus the ten Hezbollah MPs)
1 in the Kataeb bloc (plus the party's two MPs)

References

Lebanon
2000 in Lebanon
Elections in Lebanon
Election and referendum articles with incomplete results